Alternative Comics is an American independent graphic novel and comic book publisher currently based in Cupertino, California. In addition to publishing creator-owned titles, Alternative Comics is also a noted publisher of anthologies such as 9-11: Emergency Relief, Hi-Horse, Hickee, Rosetta, and True Porn.

History 
Alternative Press was founded in 1993 by Jeff Mason — while he was still a law student at the University of Florida — in order to publish Indy Magazine, a magazine devoted to small-label music and comics. (Indy was published in print form with Founder Dan DeBono from 1993 to 1997 and revived as a digital magazine from 2004 to 2005).

In 1996, Mason made the decision to publish comics, specifically to give up-and-coming creators their first break in the industry. The company changed its name to Alternative Comics and began publishing such cartoonists as Steven Weissman, Ed Brubaker, and Sam Henderson. At this point, the company established its policy of giving creators "complete artistic and legal control of their work."

In 1999, Alternative Comics published Monica's Story, by James Kochalka and Tom Hart, which satirized the Starr Report's coverage of President Bill Clinton's affair with former White House intern Monica Lewinsky. Proceeds from Monica's Story benefitted the Comic Book Legal Defense Fund. The publisher also received mainstream notice for publishing 2001's Titans of Finance: True Tales of Money and Business, by R. Walker and Josh Neufeld; and 2002's 9-11: Emergency Relief, a post-9/11 benefit anthology.

In 2003–2004, the company expanded its offerings, debuting new ongoing titles by such cartoonists as Graham Annable, Scott Campbell, Damon Hurd, Nick Bertozzi, and Josh Neufeld, as well as a number of one-shots and graphic novels. Alternative faced a major financial challenge in 2004 as a result of the 2002 bankruptcy of the distributor LPC. The company scaled back its publication schedule and was forced to cancel a few titles.

Mason operated Alternative Comics from 1993 to 2008, when the company went defunct.

In July 2012, it was announced that Alternative Comics was resuming operations under the new general manager Marc Arsenault, and moving to Cupertino, California.

Creators 
Cartoonists who have published with Alternative include Graham Annable, Gabrielle Bell, Nick Bertozzi, Brandon Graham, Asaf Hanuka, Tomer Hanuka, Tom Hart, Dean Haspiel, Sam Henderson, James Kochalka, David Lasky, Jon Lewis, Matt Madden, Josh Neufeld, Dash Shaw, Jen Sorensen, and Sara Varon.

The company is also known as a distributor for Xeric Foundation award-winners, such as Leela Corman, Derek Kirk Kim, Neufeld, Bishakh Som, Sorensen, Karl Stevens, Lauren Weinstein, and many others.

Ongoing or limited series
 Alternative Comics, 2003–2013
 Bipolar, by Asaf Hanuka, & Tomer Hanuka, 2001–2004
 Detour, by Ed Brubaker, 1997
 A Fine Mess, by Matt Madden, 2002–2004
 Hickee, by Graham Annable, Scott Campbell, Joe White, et al., 2003–2007
 Injury, by Ted May, et al., 2012-
 Magic Whistle, by Sam Henderson, 1998–present
 My Uncle Jeff, written by Damon Hurd & illustrated by Pedro Camello, 2003
 Peanutbutter & Jeremy, by James Kochalka, 2004
 The Power of 6, by Jon Lewis, 2006
 Reich, by Elijah Brubaker, 2017
 Rosetta, edited by Ng Suat Tong, 2003–2005
 Rubbernecker, by Nick Bertozzi, 2002–2004
 Slowpoke, by Jen Sorensen, 1998–2004
 A Sort of Homecoming, by Damon Hurd and Pedro Camello, 2003–2007
 Spectacles, by Jon Lewis, 1997–1998
 True Stories, by Derf Backderf, 2014–present
 True Swamp, by Jon Lewis, 2000–2001
 Urban Hipster, by David Lasky & Greg Stump, 1998–2003
 The Vagabonds, by Josh Neufeld, 2003-2006
 Yikes, by Steven Weissman, 1997–1998

Selected titles

 9-11: Emergency Relief, by various writers and artists, January 2002, .
 Aim to Dazzle, by Dean Haspiel, 2003
 The Cute Manifesto, by James Kochalka, 2005, .
 Fancy Froglin's Sexy Forest, by James Kochalka, 2003, .
 Fantastic Butterflies, by James Kochalka, 2002, .
 Further Grickle, by Graham Annable, 2003, .
 Grickle, by Graham Annable, 2001, .
 Magic Whistle, by Sam Henderson, 1998–2016
 Monica's Story, by "Anonymous," James Kochalka, and Tom Hart, 1999
 The Mother's Mouth, by Dash Shaw, 2006, .
 Never Ending Summer, by Allison Cole, 2004, .
 Opposable Thumbs, by Dean Haspiel, 2001
 Peanutbutter & Jeremy, by James Kochalka, 2004, .
 Pizzeria Kamikaze, written by Etgar Keret & illustrated by Asaf Hanuka, 2006, .
 The Placebo Man, by Tomer Hanuka, 2006, .
 Quit Your Job, by James Kochalka, 1998, .
 RabbitHead, by Rebecca Dart, 2004, .
 Red Eye, Black Eye, by K. Thor Jensen, 2007
 Rubber Necker, by Nick Bertozzi, 2002–2004
 Salmon Doubts, by Adam Sacks, 2004, .
 Stickleback, by Graham Annable, 2005, .
 A Strange Day, written by Damon Hurd & illustrated by Tatiana Gill, 2005
 Strum and Drang: Great Moments in Rock 'n' Roll, by Joel Orff, 2003, .
 Subway Series, 2002, by Leela Corman .
 Sweaterweather, by Sara Varon, 2003, .
 Titans of Finance, by R. Walker & Josh Neufeld, 2001
 True Swamp, by Jon Lewis.
 Waterwise, by Joel Orff, 2004, .
 When I'm Old, by Gabrielle Bell, 2003, .
 The White Elephant, written by Damon Hurd & illustrated by Chris Steininger, 2005, .

References

Notes

Sources consulted

External links 

 

 
Companies based in Cupertino, California
Publishing companies established in 1993
Lists of comics by publisher
Book publishing companies based in the San Francisco Bay Area
1993 establishments in Florida